Canyon was an American country music group composed of Steve Cooper (vocals, guitar), Johnny Boatright (guitar), Jay Brown (keyboards), Randy Rigney (bass) and Keech Rainwater (drums), who replaced Randy Smith, their original drummer. Between 1988 and 1989, the band released two studio albums on 16th Avenue. They also charted nine songs on the Billboard Hot Country Singles & Tracks chart, including the Top 40 single "Hot Nights". Canyon got their big break on the show Star Search with Ed McMahon, where they were the runner up to Sawyer Brown in 1983 for Vocal Band.

They were nominated in 1991 at the Academy of Country Music for Top New Vocal Duo or Group, along with Prairie Oyster and Pirates of the Mississippi, but lost to the Pirates of the Mississippi. 

After Canyon disbanded, Rainwater and Britt joined the group Texassee in 1992, who would later change their name to Lonestar.

Discography

Albums

Singles

Music videos

Nominations
Academy of Country Music
 1990 Top New Vocal Duo or Group

References

External links
[ Canyon] at AllMusic

Country music groups from Texas
Musical groups from Texas
16th Avenue Records artists